Dennis Ernest Tedlock (June 19, 1939 – June 3, 2016) was the McNulty Professor of English and Research Professor of Anthropology at the State University of New York at Buffalo.

He received his Ph.D. in 1968 from Tulane University. In 1986, he won the 
PEN Translation Prize for his book Popul Vuh: The Mayan Book of the Dawn of Life, and in 1997 was the joint recipient of the American Anthropological Association President's Award, along with his wife, Barbara Tedlock.

He was a proponent of dialogical anthropology.

Notes

References

External links
 

1939 births
2016 deaths
Tulane University alumni
American anthropologists
American Mesoamericanists
Mayanists
Translators from Mayan
University at Buffalo faculty
20th-century Mesoamericanists
American academics of English literature
20th-century translators
American Anthropologist editors